Pooja Sahasrabudhe is an Indian International Table tennis player from Thane, Maharashtra. She comes from a humble middle-class background, and was born and brought up in Thane, Maharashtra. She took to Table tennis at the age of 9 in the year 2000 and showed keen interest and great talent in the sport. Her coach Mrs. Shailaja Gohad at the Boosters TT Academy, was quick to notice this and it was under her guidance that Pooja groomed as a player. She started representing India at a very young age. Pooja did her schooling and graduation from Thane and was absorbed by ONGC in the year 2010. Pooja recently got married and moved to Pune, India where she continues to train under the guidance of Mr. Rohit Chaudhary - a Shiv Chatrapatee Awardee and her husband Mr. Aniket Koparkar - an ex-international himself.

She has won the Singles National Championship in the U-17  and U-21  events and as of February 2016 she is ranked no.3 in India in the Women's Singles Category and is currently a member of the Indian National Women's Table Tennis Team

Career highlights

 U-17 Junior Girls Singles National Champion 2006-07 at Cuttak, India
 Silver Medal in the Women's Doubles Event at the Commonwealth Youth Games 2008 held at Pune India
 U-21 Youth Girls Singles National Champion 2009-10 at Raipur, India
 Gold Medal in Women's Team Event and Silver Medal in Women's Doubles event at the 2010 South Asian Games
 Bronze Medal at the ITTF World Tour, Morocco Open 
 Gold Medal in Women Team Event and Bronze Medal in Women's Doubles at 3rd Fajr Cup 2014, Tehran Iran
 Member of the Indian National Women's Table Tennis Team for the 2014 World Team Table Tennis Championships at Tokyo Japan
 Member of the Indian National Women's Team for the Asian Table Tennis Championships 2015 at Pattaya Thailand
 Gold Medal in Team Event (part of PSPB team), Gold Medal in Mixed Doubles along with fellow PSPB teammate Harmeet Desai  and Silver Medal in the Women's Singles Event  at the 77th Senior National and Inter-State Table Tennis Championships at Hyderabad India
 2 Gold Medals in Team Event and in Mixed Doubles event at the 2016 South Asian Games held at Shillong India
 Member of the Indian National Women's Table Tennis Team for the 2016 World Team Table Tennis Championships at Kuala Lumpur Malaysia
 Won gold medal in 2018 Commonwealth Games in Women's team event with Manika Batra, Mouma Das, Sutirtha Mukherjee & Madhurika Patkar.

References

Indian female table tennis players
Living people
1991 births
Sportswomen from Maharashtra
People from Thane
21st-century Indian women
21st-century Indian people
Table tennis players at the 2018 Commonwealth Games
Commonwealth Games medallists in table tennis
Commonwealth Games gold medallists for India
South Asian Games gold medalists for India
South Asian Games medalists in table tennis
Medallists at the 2018 Commonwealth Games